Ali Naqvi may refer to:

Ali Naqi Naqvi, mujtahid from Lucknow, India
Syed Ali Naqi Naqvi Qumi, mujtahid from Lahore, Pakistan
Ali Naqvi (cricketer), Pakistani cricketer

Others
Zafar Ali Naqvi, Indian politician and member of the Parliament of India, representing the Lakhimpur Kheri constituency
Mohammed Ali Naqvi, Pakistani filmmaker

See also
 Naqvi (disambiguation)